Micropterix isobasella is a species of moth belonging to the family Micropterigidae. It has a restricted alpine distribution in southern Switzerland and northern Italy.

The forewings are gold-coloured with a greenish tinge and, unlike many of its congeners, have little or no patterning. Very little is known about the life history of this species and the larva and pupa are unknown.

References

Further reading

Micropterigidae
Moths described in 1871
Moths of Europe